The Berger Building is a historic building in Nashville, Tennessee, USA.

Location
The building is located at 164 North 8th Avenue (Rosa L Parks Blvd) in Nashville, the county seat of Davidson County, Tennessee. It is downtown.

History
In 1925, Samuel Berger, a businessman, purchased the land as an investment. He hired architect O. J. Billis to design this two-storey building. It was completed in 1926, and Berger leased it to other businesses for commercial use.

When Berger died in 1934, the building was willed to Vanderbilt University. It belonged to the university for the next two decades, until they sold it in 1954.

Architectural significance
It has been listed on the National Register of Historic Places since November 8, 1984.

References

Buildings and structures in Nashville, Tennessee
Commercial buildings on the National Register of Historic Places in Tennessee
Commercial buildings completed in 1926
Vanderbilt University
National Register of Historic Places in Nashville, Tennessee